Michael Griffith (born 6 September 1933) is a South African cricketer. He played in 26 first-class matches for Border from 1957/58 to 1964/65.

See also
 List of Border representative cricketers

References

External links
 

1933 births
Living people
South African cricketers
Border cricketers
Cricketers from Johannesburg